Gateway is a census-designated place (CDP) in Matanuska-Susitna Borough, Alaska, United States. It is part of the Anchorage, Alaska Metropolitan Statistical Area. The population was 5,748 at the 2020 census, up from 5,552 in 2010. Gateway is the fifth-most populated CDP in the borough.

Geography
Gateway is located at  (61.576398, -149.252506).

Demographics

Gateway first appeared on the 2000 U.S. Census as an unincorporated census-designated place (CDP).

As of the census of 2000, there were 2,952 people, 981 households, and 781 families residing in the CDP. There were 1,084 housing units at an average density of 66.6/sq mi (25.7/km2). The racial makeup of the CDP was 88.3% White, 0.7% Black or African American, 4.0% Native American, 0.9% Asian, 0.1% Pacific Islander, 1.0% from other races, and 5.0% from two or more races.  2.4% of the population were Hispanic or Latino of any race.

There were 981 households, out of which 49.6% had children under the age of 18 living with them, 66.8% were married couples living together, 7.8% had a female householder with no husband present, and 20.3% were non-families. 15.8% of all households were made up of individuals, and 2.7% had someone living alone who was 65 years of age or older.  The average household size was 3.01 and the average family size was 3.36.

In the CDP, the population was spread out, with 34.5% under the age of 18, 6.2% from 18 to 24, 31.6% from 25 to 44, 22.6% from 45 to 64, and 5.1% who were 65 years of age or older.  The median age was 33 years. For every 100 females, there were 100.0 males.  For every 100 females age 18 and over, there were 101.8 males.

The median income for a household in the CDP was $60,385, and the median income for a family was $65,990. Males had a median income of $51,250 versus $37,135 for females. The per capita income for the CDP was $24,548.  About 5.2% of families and 7.2% of the population were below the poverty line, including 12.3% of those under age 18 and 4.0% of those age 65 or over.

References

Anchorage metropolitan area
Census-designated places in Alaska
Census-designated places in Matanuska-Susitna Borough, Alaska